Juraj Miklušica (14 April 1938 – 26 August 2018) was a Czechoslovakian cyclist. He competed in the tandem event at the 1960 Summer Olympics.

References

External links
 

1938 births
2018 deaths
Slovak male cyclists
Olympic cyclists of Czechoslovakia
Cyclists at the 1960 Summer Olympics
Sportspeople from Bratislava